In the 1826 elections in Pennsylvania, a tie vote occurred in the .  As a result, no candidate won in that district and a special election was held on October 9, 1827.

Election results

Sergeant took his seat at the start of the First Session of the 20th Congress.  His election was unsuccessfully contested.

See also
List of special elections to the United States House of Representatives

References

Pennsylvania 1827 02
Pennsylvania 1827 02
1827 02
Pennsylvania 02
United States House of Representatives 02
United States House of Representatives 1827 02